The 2002 Asian Canoe Slalom Championships were the 2nd Asian Canoe Slalom Championships and took place from May 20–21, 2002 in Karaj River, Karaj, Iran.

Medal summary

Medal table

References

Official Results

External links
Official ACC site

Canoe
Asian Canoe Slalom Championships
Asian Canoeing Championships
International sports competitions hosted by Iran